The 2004 Missouri Valley Conference men's soccer season was the 14th season of men's varsity soccer in the conference.

The 2004 Missouri Valley Conference Men's Soccer Tournament was hosted by Creighton and won by SMU.

Teams

MVC Tournament

See also 

 Missouri Valley Conference
 Missouri Valley Conference men's soccer tournament
 2004 NCAA Division I men's soccer season
 2004 in American soccer

References 

Missouri Valley Conference
2004 NCAA Division I men's soccer season